Australian Made: The Hits is the compilation cast album of cover songs released by the finalists of Australian Idol 2005. The songs were chosen based on the first Australian Idol 3 liveshow theme on 11 September 2005, which was Australian Hits, there was also a corresponding DVD featuring the performances from this particular show.

Track listing
"Ready" by the Australian Idol 3 Top 13
"Cry in Shame" by Dan England
"I Don't Want To Be With Nobody But You" by Anne Robertson
"The Day You Went Away" by James Kannis
"Absolutely Everybody" by Natalie Zahra
"Throw Your Arms Around Me" by Chris Luder
"Please Don't Ask Me" by Kate DeAraugo
"Holy Grail" by Lee Harding
"Playing To Win" by Milly Edwards
"Buses & Trains" by Emily Williams
"Forever Now" by Roxane LeBrasse
"Tucker's Daughter" by Daniel Spillane
"You're My World" by Laura Gissara
"(Baby I've Got You) On My Mind" by Tarni Stephens

External links
Australian Idol

Pop albums by Australian artists
Compilation albums by Australian artists
2005 compilation albums